Vanville can be:

 Vanvillé, Seine-et-Marne, France
 Vanville, West Virginia, United States